Agadir is a major city in Morocco, on the shore of the Atlantic Ocean near the foot of the Atlas Mountains, just north of the point where the Souss River flows into the ocean, and  south of Casablanca. Agadir is the capital of the Agadir Ida-U-Tanan Prefecture and of the Souss-Massa economic region. The majority of its inhabitants speak Berber, one of Morocco's two official languages.

Agadir is one of the major urban centres of Morocco. The municipality of Agadir recorded a population of 924,000 in the 2014 Moroccan census. According to the 2004 census, there were 346,106 inhabitants in that year and the population of the Prefecture of Agadir-Ida Outanane was 487,954 inhabitants. Three languages are spoken in the city: Tashelhit (first language of the majority), Moroccan Arabic, and French.

It was the site of the 1911 Agadir Crisis that exposed tensions between France and Germany, foreshadowing World War I. The city was destroyed by an earthquake in 1960; it has been completely rebuilt with mandatory seismic standards. It is now the largest seaside resort in Morocco, where foreign tourists and many residents are attracted by an unusually mild year-round climate. Since 2010 it has been well served by low-cost flights and a motorway from Tangier.

The mild winter climate (January average midday temperature 20.5 °C/69 °F) and good beaches have made it a major "winter sun" destination for northern Europeans.

Etymology
The name Agadir is a common Berber noun agadir meaning 'wall, enclosure, fortified building, citadel'. This noun is attested in most Berber languages, and may be a loanword from Phoenician-Punic, a Semitic language spoken in North Africa in antiquity.

There are many more towns in Morocco called Agadir. The city of Agadir's full name in Tashelhit is Agadir n Yighir, literally 'the fortress of the cape', referring to the nearby promontory named Cape Ighir on maps (a pleonastic name, literally 'Cape Cape'). Ighir in Berber refers to a mountain or a hill.

A single male inhabitant or native of the town is known in Tashelhit as a gg ugadir (also a common surname, Gougadir in French spelling), plural ayt ugadir 'men of Agadir' (also a collective name, 'men and women of Agadir, people of Agadir'); a single feminine inhabitant is a ult ugadir 'woman of Agadir', plural ist ugadir 'women of Agadir'. In Moroccan Arabic, an inhabitant is a agadiri, plural agadiriyin, feminine agadiriya, plural agadiriyat.

Numismatic inscriptions in the Phoenician language record that the Phoenicians knew Cádiz as a Gadir or Agadir (Phoenician: ‬𐤀𐤂𐤃𐤓, ʾgdr), meaning 'wall', 'compound', or (by metonymy) 'stronghold'. Borrowed into Berber languages, this became agadir (Tamazight: 'wall'; Shilha: 'fortified granary'), a word that is common in North African place names.

History

Early occupation 
Phoenicians from Tyre founded Agadir (alternately, "Gadir") around 1104 BC. There is little record of the area before that time.

The oldest known map that includes an indication of Agadir is from 1325: at the approximate location of the modern city, it names a place it calls Porto Mesegina, after a Berber tribe name that had been recorded as early as the 12th century, the Mesguina (also known as the Ksima). At the end of the medieval period, Agadir was a town of some renown. The first known mention of its name, Agadir al-harba, was recorded in 1510.

Portuguese occupation 
In the late 15th century the Portuguese began to occupy positions along the Moroccan coast. In 1505 the Portuguese nobleman João Lopes de Sequeira occupied the area in 1505. He built a wooden castle at the foot of a hill, near a spring, and a Portuguese colony named Santa Cruz do Cabo do Gué was created. The site still bears the name of Funti or Founti (from the Portuguese word fonte, meaning "fountain"). The castle was later bought by the King of Portugal on 25 January 1513.

The Portuguese presence elicited growing hostility from the local population of the Sous region, who initiated a years-long economic and military blockade of the port. In 1510 Muhammad al-Qa'im, the leader of a Sharifian family in that had established themselves in the Sous, was declared leader of the local military efforts against the Sous. His descendants went on to found the Sa'di dynasty which rose to power over the following decades and evenually established their capital at Marrakesh. In 1540 the Sa'di sultan Muhammad al-Shaykh occupied the main hill (now Agadir Oufla) above the Portuguese and installed artillery to prepare an attack on the fortress below. The siege of the colony began on 16 February 1541 and was successfully concluded on 12 March of the same year. 

Six hundred Portuguese survivors were taken prisoner, including the governor, Guterre de Monroy, and his daughter, Dona Mecia. The captives were redeemed by the holy men,  who were mostly from Portugal. Dona Mecia, whose husband was killed during the battle, became the wife of Sheikh Mohammed ash-Sheikh but died in childbirth in 1544. In the same year, Mohammed ash-Sheikh released Guterre de Monroy, whom he had befriended. After this, the Portuguese were forced to abandon most of the Moroccan areas that they had acquired control of between 1505 and 1520, including  Agadir, Safi and Azemmour. By 1550, Portugal's only holding in Morocco was Mazagan (now El Jadida), Tangier and Ceuta. As Morocco became less important to the Portuguese, they turned their attention to India and Brazil.

The story of the Portuguese presence (from the installation in 1505 until their defeat on 12 March 1541) is described in  a manuscript (published for the first time, with a French translation by Pierre de Cenival, in 1934) entitled "Este He O Origem e Comeco e Cabo da Villa de Santa Cruz do Cabo de Gue D'Agoa de Narba", written by an anonymous author who was captured in 1934 and was imprisoned for five years in Taroudannt (cf. "Santa Cruz do Cabo de Gue d'Agoa de Narba – Estudo e Crónica", Joao Marinho e Santos, José Manuel Azevedo e Silva e Mohammed Nadir, bilingual edition, Viseu 2007).

Moroccan rule 
After the Sa'di victory the site was then left unoccupied for years until Muhammad al-Shaykh's successor, Abdallah al-Ghalib (r. 1557–1574), built a new fortress (or kasbah) on the hilltop. It was now called Agadir N'Ighir (literally: "fortified granary of the hill" in Tachelhit.

In the 17th century, during the reign of the Berber dynasty of Tazerwalt, Agadir was a harbour of some importance, expanding its trade with Europe. There was, however, neither a real port nor a wharf. Agadir traded mainly in sugar, wax, copper, hides and skins. In exchange, Europeans sold their manufactured goods there, particularly weapons and textiles. Under the reign of Sultan Moulay Ismail (1645–1727) and his successors, the trade with France, which had previously been an active partner, diminished, and trade with the English and Dutch increased.

In 1731, the town was completely destroyed by an earthquake. After that, Agadir's harbour was ordered to be closed, and an alternative, Essaouira, was established farther north.

After a long period of prosperity during the reigns of the Saadian and Alawite dynasties, Agadir declined from 1760 because of the pre-eminence given to the competing port of Essaouira by the Alawite Sultan Mohammed ben Abdallah who wanted to punish the Souss for rebelling against his authority. This decline lasted a century and a half. In 1789, a European traveler gave a brief description of Agadir: "It is now a ghost town, there are no more than a few houses and these are crumbling into ruins".

In 1881, Sultan Moulay Hassan reopened the harbour to trade in order to supply the expeditions he planned in the south. These expeditions, which were to reassert his authority over the Souss tribes and counter the plans of English and Spanish, were held in 1882 and 1886.

In 1884, Charles de Foucauld described in Reconnaissance au Maroc (Reconnaissance in Morocco) his rapid passage to Agadir from the east:

On the pretext of a call for help from German companies in the valley of the Souss, Germany decided on 1 July 1911, to extend its interests in Morocco and assert a claim on the country. Very strong international reaction, particularly from Great Britain, surprised Germany and triggered the Agadir Crisis between France and Germany. War threatened. After tough negotiations, a Franco-German treaty was finally signed on 4 November 1911, giving a free hand to France, who would be able to establish its protectorate over Morocco in return for giving up some colonies in Africa. It was only then that the gunboat Panther and the cruiser Berlin left the bay of Agadir. Due to a miscalculation, the German sales representative Hermann Wilberg, who was sent to provide the pretext for the intervention, only arrived at Agadir three days after the Panther arrived.

In 1913, the cities (Agadir N'Ighir and Founti) totalled less than a thousand inhabitants. On 15 June 1913 French troops landed in Agadir. In 1916, the first pier was built near Founti – a simple jetty, later known as the "Portuguese jetty", which remained until the end of the 20th century. After 1920, under the French protectorate, a port was built and the city saw its first development with the construction of the old Talborjt district located on the plateau at the foot of the hill. Two years later, beside Talborjt along the faultline of the river Tildi construction of the popular district of Yahchech began.

Around 1930, Agadir was an important stop for the French airmail service Aéropostale and was frequented by Saint-Exupéry and Mermoz.

In the years from 1930, a modern central city began to be built according to the plans of the urban planner Henri Prost, director of the Urban Planning Department of the Protectorate, and his deputy Albert Laprade: a horseshoe layout based on the waterfront around a large avenue perpendicular to the waterfront – the Avenue Lyautey, since renamed Avenue du Général Kettani. In the 1950s, urban development continued under the direction of the Director of Urban Planning Morocco, Michel Ecochard.

After 1950 and the opening of the new commercial port, the city grew with fishing, canning, agriculture, and mining. It also began to open up to tourism due to its climate and hotel infrastructure.

In 1959, the port was visited by the yacht of the Greek shipping magnate Aristotle Onassis and his guest, Winston Churchill.

By 1960, Agadir numbered over 40,000 residents when at 15 minutes to midnight on 29 February 1960, it was again almost totally destroyed by an earthquake of magnitude 5.7 on the Richter scale that lasted 15 seconds, burying the city and killing more than a third of the population. The death toll was estimated at 15,000. The earthquake destroyed the old Kasbah.

Agadir after 1960

The current city was rebuilt  further south, led by the architects associated with GAMMA, including Jean-François Zevaco, Elie Azagury, Pierre Coldefy, and Claude Verdugo, with consultation from Le Corbusier. Agadir became a large city of over half a million by 2004, with a large port with four basins: the commercial port with a draft of 17 metres, triangle fishing, fishing port, and a pleasure boat port with marina. Agadir was the premier sardine port in the world in the 1980s and has a beach stretching over 10 km with fine seafront promenades. Its climate has 340 days of sunshine per year which allows for swimming all year round. The winter is warm and in summer, haze is common.

With Marrakech, Agadir is a very important centre for tourism  to Morocco, and the city is the most important fishing port in the country. Business is also booming with the export of citrus fruit and vegetables produced in the fertile valley of Souss. 

On 12 December 2022, an earthquake of magnitude 4.5 hit Agadir Province. The earthquake struck at a depth of three kilometres beneath the epicenter, off the coast of Agadir.

Geography 

The current conurbation of Agadir is actually a combination of four communes:

 the former town of Agadir city
 the urban commune of Anza
 the rural town of Ben Sergao and
 the rural town of Tikiwine

New Talborjt
This area is named after the old district of Talborjt (meaning "small fort" in local Berber, in remembrance of the water tower which was first built on the plateau in the former Talborjt). Lively, the New Talborjt which has been rebuilt away from the Old Talborjt, has as the main artery the Boulevard Mohammed Sheikh Saadi, named after the victor against the Portuguese in 1541. Other major avenues are the Avenue President Kennedy and the Avenue February 29. There is also the Mohammed V mosque, the Olhão garden (Olhão is a coastal city in southern Portugal that is twinned with Agadir), and its memorial museum and the garden Ibn Zaydoun. Some good hotels and restaurants have been built on the main arteries.

Residential districts
 Swiss Village: the oldest district of villas bordered by the Avenue of FAR (Royal Armed Forces), Avenue Mokhtar Soussi, Cairo Avenue, and the Avenue of the United Nations.
 Mixed Sector District (THE NEW IHCHACH): the French and Spanish Consulates are in this district.
 Founty or "Bay of palm trees": a seaside area with residential villas, large hotels, holiday homes, and the royal palace.
 High Founty: a new district of buildings and residential villas, located in the new city centre between the new Court of Appeal and the Marjane supermarket.
 Illigh: to the east in front of the Hassan II hospital, is a residential area of large villas, housing the "new bourgeoisie".
 Charaf: The Hassan II hospital is in this district.
 Les Amicales: also known as the "city of government employees"
 Dakhla: close to the faculty of Ibnou Zohr, it has a great mix between modern buildings, ordinary villas, and studio apartments. This new town created in 1979 was the last work before his death of the renowned French urbanist, Gérald Hanning. 
 Hay Mohammadi: a new urbanization zone in Agadir with a villa zone and a zone for large groups of buildings to frame the extension of the Avenue des FAR in the northwest.
 Adrar City: a new district next to the Metro hypermarket.
 Other neighborhoods: Amsernat, Lakhyam, Erac Bouargane, Massira, Alhouda, Tilila, Tassila, Ben Sergao, Riad Assalam, Islane, Ihchach (Yachech) Nahda, Anza, Assaka, Bir Anzarane, Tikouine, Zaitoune and Tadart.

The Casbah

The Casbah (Agadir Oufella, Agadir le haut, Agadir N'Ighir, or Agadir de la colline) was, along with Founti by the sea, the oldest district of Agadir. An authentic fortress with winding streets and lively, the Casbah was built in 1572 by Abdallah al-Ghalib. Above the front door; today, the original inscription in Arabic and in English reads: "God, the Nation, the King."

Of this fortress there remains, after the earthquake of 29 February 1960, a restored long high wall that surrounds land that is not buildable. There is, however, a view over the bay of Agadir and the ports. The old people of Agadir remember the "Moorish café" of the Casbah and its panoramic view.

The hill bears the inscription in Arabic: "God, Country, King" which, like the walls, is illuminated at night.

Old Talborjt
Overlooking the waterfront and Wadi Tildi, this old district (whose name is sometimes spelled Talbordjt) was once a shopping area and very lively with its large square where there was a weekly market, hotels, schools, mosque. 90% of the buildings in Old Talborjt were destroyed or severely damaged by the earthquake in 1960. Razed to the ground after the earthquake and now overgrown, it is classified as non-buildable area.

Souk El Had
This is the largest market in the region. It has about 6,000 small shops. It is surrounded by walls and has several entrances. It is organized into different sectors: furniture, crafts, clothing, vegetables, meat, spices etc. It is possible to find all kinds of handicrafts and traditional decorations.

The walls have been restored and the interior design is being finished.

La Médina

La Médina is a handicrafts space created in 1992 by the Italian artist Coco Polizzi, at Ben Sergao, a district close to Agadir  from the city centre. Built using techniques of traditional Berber construction, it is a kind of small open-air museum, on five hectares and home to artisan workshops, a museum, individual residences, a small hotel, and an exotic garden.

Subdivisions
The prefecture is divided administratively into communes.

Climate 

Agadir has a semi-arid climate (Köppen: BSh) with warm summers and mild winters. Located along the Atlantic Ocean, Agadir has a very mild climate. The daytime temperature generally stays in the 20s °C (70s °F) every day, with the winter highs typically reaching  in December and January.

Rainfall is almost entirely confined to the winter months and is heavily influenced by the NAO, with negative NAO indices producing wet winters and positive NAO correlating with drought. For instance, in the wettest month on record of December 1963, as much as  fell, whereas in the positive NAO year from July 1960 to June 1961 a mere  occurred over the twelve months.

Occasionally however, the region experiences winds from the Sahara called Chergui, which may exceptionally and for two to five days raise the heat above . The official record high temperature of Agadir is  registered on July 17, 2012. The record of 51.7 °C degrees, which was on 19 August 1940, is disputed.

In 1950, a poster from the Navigation Company Pacquet proclaimed: "Winter or summer, I bathe in Agadir".

Economy 
The city had an annual growth rate of over 6% per year in housing demand while housing production barely exceeds 3.4%.

Agadir's economy relies mainly on tourism and fisheries. Agricultural activities are based around the city. Agadir has one of the biggest souks in Morocco (Souk El Had).

The fishing port is a major sardine port. The commercial port is also known for its exports of cobalt, manganese, zinc and citrus products. The Avenue du Port, the main artery of the Anza district, is surrounded by canneries and has many popular small restaurants adjacent to the fish market. The city has a cement company called Ciments du Maroc (CIMAR), a subsidiary of the Italian group Italcementi which is in process of being transferred to a new plant  from the city. There is also a shipyard in the port and the only merchant marine school in Morocco.

Agadir is served by Al Massira Airport,  from the city.

Culture
The Timitar festival, a festival of Amazigh culture and music from around the world, has been held in Agadir every summer since its inception in July 2004.

The Morocco Movement association is involved in the arts and organizes concerts, exhibitions and meetings in the visual arts, design, music, graphic design, photography, environment and health.

Other cultural events in Agadir are:
Noiz Makerz concert of urban music.
Breaking South national break-dancing championship
International Documentary Film Festival in November (FIDADOC)
Film Festival for immigration
International Festival of University Theatre of Agadir
Concert for Tolerance (November)
Festival of Laughter
International Salon of Art of Photography (Clubphoto d'Agadir)

Museums 
Musée de Talborjt "La Casbah"
Musée Bert Flint
Le Musée des Arts Berberes
Musee Municipal de Agadir
La Medina d'Agadir

Education
The city of Agadir has a university: the University Ibn Zohr which includes a Faculty of Science, Faculty of medicine and pharmacy, Faculty of Law, Economics and Social Sciences, the Faculty of Arts and Humanities, and the multi-disciplined Faculty of Ouarzazate.

There are also establishments of higher education such as:
the National School of Applied Sciences (ENSA)
the National School of Business and Management (ENCG)
the Graduate School of Agadir technology (ESTA).

There is an international French school: the French School of Agadir and also public schools: Youssef Ben Tachfine School, Mohammed Reda-Slaoui School, and the Al-Idrissi Technical College.

Highschools in the city include: 
Groupe Scolaire Paul Gauguin Agadir (CLOSED in 2014)
Groupe Scolaire LE DEFI
Lycée Lala Meryem Agadir
Lycée Qualifiant Youssef Ben Tachfine
Lycée Technique Al Idrissi
Lycée Al Qalam
Lycée Al Hanane
Lycée Français d'Agadir
Lycée Anoual
Lycée Zerktouni
Lycée Mohamed Derfoufi
Lycée Bader Elouefaq
Lycée Ibn Maja
Lycée Mounib
Lycée Al Inbiaat

Sports
The city of Agadir has a football club known as Hassania Agadir and the city has built the new Adrar Stadium, which the team plays its home matches at. The city also hosts the Royal Tennis Club of Agadir.

The Hassan II Golf Trophy and Lalla Meryem Cup golf tournaments of the European Tour and Ladies European Tour are held at the Golf du Palais Royal in Agadir since 2011.

People 
Dominique Strauss-Kahn – spent his childhood there from 1951 to 1960
Omar Hilale – Permanent ambassador of Morocco to the United Nations
Jacques Bensimon, Canadian filmmaker, was born in Agadir
Michel Vieuchange, French adventurer and explorer, died in Agadir in 1930
Mohamed Bensaid Ait Idder, Moroccan politician and activist
Mohammed Khair-Eddine (1941–1995) – Moroccan writer
Mohamed Choua – Basketball player
Hassan Kachloul – former Morocco national football team player, most notably playing for Southampton, Aston Villa and Wolves
Issam Chebake – Moroccan footballer
Walid Azaro – Moroccan footballer
Jalal Daoudi – Moroccan footballer
Hicham El Majhad – Moroccan footballer
Sion Assidon – Moroccan activist
Karim El Berkaoui – Moroccan footballer
Abdelkrim Baadi – Moroccan footballer
Saadia Himi – Miss Netherlands Earth 2004

Nearby beaches 

Some of the most popular beaches in Morocco are located to the north of Agadir. Areas known for surfing are located near Taghazout village to Cap Ghir.

Many smaller and clean beaches are located along this coast. Some of them between Agadir and Essaouira are: Agadir Beach, Tamaounza (12 km), Aitswal Beach, Imouran (17 km), Taghazout (19 km), Bouyirdn (20 km), Timzguida (22 km), Aghroud (30 km), Imiouadar (27 km).

Main sights
Agadir Crocodile park
The view of the city and the bay from Agadir Oufella (Casbah)
Valley of the Birds, a pleasant bird park stretching along the Avenue of Administrations, between Boulevard Hassan II and 20 August
The garden of Ibn Zaidoun
Mohammed V Mosque, on the Boulevard President Kennedy
Souk el Had
Amazigh (Berber) Heritage Museum at the Ayt Souss Square
The garden of Olhão or "Garden of Portugal" and its memorial museum in Talborjt
The marina with its Moorish architecture and shops
Loubnane Mosque
Wall of commemoration
Memory of Agadir Museum; mostly photographic exhibits which concentrate on the Agadir earthquake on 29 February 1960

Nearby attractions
The city of Taroudannt 80 km to the east, along the Souss valley
Palm Oasis of Tiout 20 km to the east of Taroudannt and 100 km from Agadir
Imouzzer Ida Ou Tanane a small town 60 km northeast of Agadir where Paradise Valley is located
The beaches of Taghazout and Tamraght. Taghazout-Argana Bay, a large tourism development, was launched in 2007
The city of Tiznit 90 km to the south and Tafraout 80 km from Tiznit, a magnificent site of pink granite rocks
The Souss-Massa National Park and Oued Massa, about 70 km to the south and the fishing village of Tifnit
Legzira beach with spectacular natural arches, 150 km south of Agadir
Sidi Ifni, 160 km south of Agadir on the coast
The city of Essaouira 175 km north of Agadir on the coast
Dephinarium Agadir Dolphin World Morocco

Movies filmed in Agadir
1934: Le Grand Jeu by Jacques Feyder
1954–1955: Oasis by Yves Allégret
1969:  Du soleil plein les yeux by Michel Boisrond
1988:  Y'a bon les blancs by Marco Ferreri
2006: Days of Glory by Rachid Bouchareb
2009:  Les Filles du désert by Hubert Besson, an episode of the television series Plus belle la vie
2011: Agadir Bombay by Myriam Bakir

Sister cities
Agadir has eight sister cities 
  Mar del Plata, Argentina
  Miami, United States
  Oakland, United States
  Olhão, Portugal
  Nantes, France
  Stavanger, Norway
  Shiraz, Iran 
  Vigan, Philippines

Cooperation Pact:
  Lyon, France

Notes

References

External links 

 Official Visit Morocco website

 
Berber populated places
Cities destroyed by earthquakes
Municipalities of Morocco
Prefecturial capitals in Morocco
Regional capitals in Morocco
Phoenician colonies in Morocco
Populated places established in 1505
Ports and harbours of Morocco
Port cities and towns on the Moroccan Atlantic Coast